Essential Records is a contemporary Christian record label based in Franklin, Tennessee. It is a division of the major label Sony Music Nashville.

History
It was established in 1992 and acquired by Brentwood Music in 1993. The label's first big hit release was "Flood" by Jars of Clay in 1996. The song was a hit on mainstream radio before hitting on Christian formats; it hit No. 12 on the Billboard Modern Rock Tracks chart and appeared in the Billboard Hot 100. Today it is part of the Sony Music Nashville, a division of Sony Music Entertainment.

Artists

Current
The current roster of artists:

 Branan Murphy
 Casting Crowns
 Elle Limebear
 Jamie Kimmett
 KB (Essential Sound/Provident)
 Land of Color
 Matt Maher
 Matthew West
 One Sonic Society
 Red Rocks Worship
 Rhett Walker
 Tauren Wells
 Elevation Worship
 Vertical Worship
 Zach Williams

Former

 Warren Barfield
 Brooke Barrettsmith (active)
 Caedmon's Call (disbanded, formerly with Fair Trade Services)
 Andy Cherry (active)
 Day of Fire (inactive)
 FFH (inactive)
 Mia Fieldes
 Fireflight (active, with RockFest Records)
 Brian Goodell
 Grey Holiday (disbanded)
 Jars of Clay (active, with  Gray Matters)
 J Monty (active, independent)
 KJ-52 (active, with BEC Records)
 Los Caminos (inactive)
 Leeland (active, with Integrity Music)
 Krystal Meyers (inactive)
 The Neverclaim
 Bebo Norman (active, with BEC Records)
 Paul Colman Trio (solo act/disbanded)
 Chuckie Perez (active, independent)
 Andrew Peterson (active, with Centricity Music)
 Pillar (active)
 Plumb (active, with Curb Records)
 Red (active, independent)
 Revive (disbanded)
 Kerrie Roberts (active, with Reunion Records)
 The Royal Royal (active)
 Royal Tailor (disbanded)
 Tal & Acacia (active)
 Tenth Avenue North (disbanded)
 Third Day (disbanded)
 True Vibe (disbanded)
 V*Enna (disbanded)
 Rhett Walker Band (disbanded)
 I Am They(Big Future Music Group/Truss Records)

References

External links
 

 
American record labels
Record labels established in 1992
Christian record labels
Sony Music